Francisco-Jesús Álvarez Curiel is a Spanish philologist and antiquarian perhaps best known for his work on popular Andalusian vocabulary. He writes in Spanish but his books have been translated into English and German.

Bibliography 

 Cancionero Popular Andaluz (Arguval, 1992)
 Supersticiones Populares Andaluzas (Arguval, 1993)
Villanueva del Rosario: Historia y Vida (Malaga, 1996)
 Vocabulario Popular Andaluz (Madrid: Arguval, 2004)
 Mil Refranes y Trece Ensayos (Arguval, 2008)

References 

Spanish philologists
20th-century Spanish writers
20th-century philologists
21st-century philologists
Year of birth missing (living people)
Living people